Hoopers Island is a chain of two islands in Dorchester County, Maryland, United States. Upper Hoopers Island and Lower Hoopers Island are surrounded by water with the Chesapeake Bay on the left side and the Honga River on the right side. The remote set of islands has much wildlife and is well known for sport fishing and crabbing industries. Hoopers Island was issued one of the earliest land grants in Dorchester County, Maryland.

Geography
Hoopers Island is located on the Eastern Shore of Maryland. The islands are situated on the south-west shores of the Chesapeake Bay in Dorchester County.

The islands are very narrow in many places and one can easily see water, the Chesapeake Bay and the Honga River, on both sides of Maryland Route 335  which travels through the islands.

Upper Hoopers island is located at N. 38°20' W. 76°14 and Middle Hoopers island is located at N. 38°16' W. 76°11. Lower Hoopers Island is now a marshland.

History

The early residents of what is now known as Hoopers Island were the Yaocomico people.  According to some local folklore,  the land was purchased from the Yaocomico tribe for five woolen blankets.

Hoopers Island is considered the oldest settled area in Dorchester County. The namesake of the islands is Henry Hooper.  Hooper was friends with the Calverts, an important family many consider to be founders of the state of Maryland. In the mid-17th century, parts of the islands were surveyed for Hooper. The first parcel of land was surveyed by Robert Clift and aptly titled Hooper's Clifts. An additional  of land was surveyed for Hooper later on in 1668. He received additional parcels of land in 1669 as well.

Though much of the land was claimed by the Hoopers, other families such as William Chaplin, Richard Bentley and Philip Shapeley owned major plots of land. In addition, some indentured servants such as Thomas Hooten and Daniel Puddiford received land.

The Hooper family

The Hooper family made Dorchester County their family home in 1669. Henry Hooper had a large family: he was married twice and had 14 children.  Henry Hooper was one of the first commissioners of Dorchester County. Many descendants of the original Henry Hooper followed in his footsteps and served on the Dorchester County legislature as well. Upon his death, Hooper left parcels of land, with names such as Hooper's Chance, Hooper's Lot, Hooper's Fortune and Hooper's Forrest to his children.

Isolation

Due to the geographical nature of Hoopers Island, the residents had to be self-sufficient and independent. Accordingly, the islanders maintained strong family and community ties. Once families moved to Hoopers Island, they stayed for generations. According to one source, for 300 years the population can be traced to just ten families. The outside world did not rapidly influence the way of life on the island.  While in the 21st century, many places find it difficult to remain isolated, Hoopers Island maintains a sense of pride on their independence and self-sufficiency.

Environment

In addition, storm and flood damage along with rising waters had and continue to have an effect on the environment and geography of the islands.

Since the early 20th century, Lower Hoopers Island is no longer inhabited. Prior to this, the island was home to the community of Applegarth which grew tremendously during the oyster boom in the 1880s. Due to erosion, the last resident was forced to leave in the late 1920s. For a short while, farmers continued to use the island to pasture their livestock. Unfortunately, a hurricane destroyed the bridge to Lower Hoopers Island in 1933.

Another section of Hoopers Island has also been affected. Swan Island, originally owned by the indentured servant, Thomas Hooten, has almost disappeared but some of the buildings still stand.

The islands are filled with wild geese and ducks throughout the marshlands. Little and great blue herons, American oystercatchers, double-crested cormorants, willets, herring gulls, Forster's common, royal, and least terns, black ducks, gadwalls, egrets, osprey, and the boat-tailed grackle can all be found in and around Hoopers Island.

Life on Hoopers Island

According to a 2018 estimate, the population of Hoopers Island was 559.

Most of the islands’ residents live in the communities of Honga, Fishing Creek and Hoopersville.  Honga and Fishing Creek can be found on Upper Hoopers Island while the southernmost village, Hoopersville, is found on Middle Hoopers Island.   As a reflection of life on the islands, oyster boats, tonging craft and crab houses are visible across the landscape.

Events

The islanders host many impressive and enduring social events. One such event involves fishing Hoopers Island. Since 1973, the William T. Ruark Fishing Tournament is considered the island's largest event.   Other events such as the Arts and Crafts Auction and Bazaar and the Ronald McGlaughlin Artisans Fair are community affairs that draw residents and visitors alike.

Community

There is a strong sense of community amongst the islanders. One endearing story painted the people and community of Hoopers Island in a very positive light: "strongly independent" "stout-hearted" "self-sufficient", great "sense of community" and "fellowship." Between a strong work ethic and family ties, the community is a strong force that has weathered some negative publicity and difficult times.  One such example occurred in the mid-20th century.

In 1954, there was a crabbers strike. Because of the large amount of crabs in the Bay, the price had been so reduced that the fishermen weren't making any money off their catches. Therefore, the crabbers went on strike. Usually strikes are organized by a union who would conduct negotiations in order to improve conditions.  For this strike, there wasn't any organized union which promoted the strike but just a tight-knit group of fishermen who wanted their voices heard. Because this strike was not employed by a union, a Baltimore Sun editorial portrayed the crabbers as lazy, uncivilized and uncooperative. In response to this editorial, the Organization of the Volunteer Fire Company sent an eloquent response. This response addressed the negative press the fishermen and the communities received, showing how the fishermen and the communities pride themselves on keeping up with modern ideas, that they were civilized and did not need to utilize unions to work together and make improvement to their lives.

Industry

Originally, the main industry on the island was crops. Hoopers Island was mainly known for tobacco crops but during the American Revolution, vegetables and grains were also grown.

Today, most people who live on Hoopers Island have some connection to the fishing industry.  The local families make a living as crabbers, oyster tongers and seafood packers. Seasonal workers from Mexico also work in the processing plants. Unfortunately, because of many factors such as water pollution, the fishing industry is on the decline. The number of crabs has been decreasing at an alarming rate, and the area governments have enacted a number of laws in order to slow the decline of the crabbing industry. As of April 2008, the governors of Maryland and Virginia considered cutting the number of harvested female crabs by one-third. According to an article in The Baltimore Sun, the crabbers of Maryland are not happy with this direction as it might force some watermen out of the business.

The Department of Natural Resources issued new regulations in March 2009, for daily bushel limits for mature female hard crabs and periods of closure for harvest of mature female hard crabs. Mature female hard crab bushel limits were assigned based on license type. The regulation further provided the DNR with the authority to establish and modify a season or catch limit by public notice based on continuous monitoring of stock conditions and harvest rates. The Department withdrew the portion of the 2009 regulatory proposal that would have required a free registration for crabbers not currently required to have a license.

Points of interest

Off the shores of Upper and Middle Hoopers Island is the Hooper's Island Lighthouse.  This lighthouse was built in 1906 and is only one of eleven pneumatic caisson lighthouses in the United States.

For over ten years, the Phillips Seafood Factory has been open to visitors. It is at this factory that blue crabs are processed. Phillips Seafood is a company that owns and operates seafood restaurants throughout the east coast.  The company origins go back to 1914 on the island, where Augustus E. Phillips established what is now Phillips Seafoods' first seafood processing plant.

Interesting facts

During the 18th century, piracy was rampant in the Chesapeake Bay. As boats, filled with supplies, were headed towards the top of the Bay, they were attacked by pirates who had been hiding in the many tributaries. Lord Dunmore, one of the more infamous pirates, created such mayhem that in 1780, Henry Hooper IV asked the governor of Maryland for assistance to stop the plundering.
An area near the islands, Meekins Neck, is the site of the first Catholic church in Dorchester County. St. Mary Star of the Sea was built in 1769.
From the mid-1880s until 1929, there was a steamboat service that went up to Baltimore. The boat left Hoopersville in the late afternoon and arrived in Baltimore at 3:30 am.

References

External links

 United States Lighthouse Society, Chesapeake Chapter
 The Old Hoopers Island Graveyard
 Dorchester County Tourism
 Sawyer Tours and Cruises, Hooper's Island, MD
 The Historical Marker Database
 Old Salty's Restaurant
 Chesapeake Bay Foundation
 Phillips Foods: The Legend of Phillips

 www.hiexped.com Hoopers Island Expeditions

 
Maryland islands of the Chesapeake Bay
Fishing communities in Maryland
Landforms of Dorchester County, Maryland